Calusari, Căluşari (and other minor variations) may refer to one of the following:
Călușari, a Romanian folk men's group dance
The Calusari, a season 2 episode of The X-Files and a mysterious ritualistic group depicted there